Spulerina hexalocha is a moth of the family Gracillariidae. It is known from Reunion, Sierra Leone and South Africa.

The larvae feed on Sclerocarya birrea and Sclerocarya caffra. They probably mine the leaves of their host plant.

References

Spulerina
Moths of Africa
Moths described in 1912